Valperinol (INN; GA 30-905) is a drug which acts as a calcium channel blocker. It was patented as a possible sedative, antiepileptic, and/or antiparkinsonian agent, but was never marketed.

References 

Ethers
1-Piperidinyl compounds